The Gigolo is a 2015 Hong Kong erotic drama film directed and written by Au Cheuk-man and starring Dominic Ho, Candy Yuen, Jeana Ho, Hazel Tong and Winnie Leung. A sequel titled The Gigolo 2 was released on 14 January 2016 with Dominic Ho reprising his role as Fung.

Plot
The film opens with Fung exercising on the vertical bar at the balcony of his house. Then it follows on through to how he started his life as a gigolo to him becoming an actor and a lover of his director, a rich man's daughter.

Cast
 Dominic Ho as Fung, a gigolo turned actor
 Candy Yuen as Michelle, a client of Fung
 Jeana Ho as Chloe, film director and Fung's girlfriend
 Hazel Tong as Yoyo, frequent client of Chris
 Winnie Leung as Belle, hair stylist for Abson
 Pal Sinn as Abson, nicknamed King of Gigolos
 Angelina Lo as Jane, Fung's mother
 Wong Chun-tong as Shing, nicknamed Big Dick Shing and Fung's father
 Jolie Fan as Jolie, Fung's first love
 Elena Kong as Hung, owner of a nightclub and Fung's cousin
 Tony Ho as Ben, Michelle's husband and Chloe's father
 Ronan Pak as Chris, a gigolo
 La Ying as Peter, Chloe's friend and also, Fung's rich high school classmate.

Box office
The film opened to HK$2.33 million (US$300,620) over four days. It has grossed a total of HK$5.58 million (US$720,000).

References

External links
 

2015 films
Hong Kong drama films
2010s erotic drama films
Hong Kong erotic films
2015 drama films
2010s Hong Kong films
Films about gigolos
2010s Cantonese-language films